Tau Cross is a rock band founded by Rob Miller of England's Amebix.

Controversy
Tau Cross' third album, Messengers of Deception, was originally scheduled for release on August 9, 2019, via Relapse Records. In July 2019, however, Relapse chose to sever its relationship with the band and cancel the album's release due to Miller's inclusion of Gerard Menuhin, a Holocaust denier, in his thanks list, submitted to the label in the late stages of production. Shortly thereafter the other four members of the band issued a joint statement expressing their lack of previous knowledge about, and desire not to be associated with, Menuhin's work and Miller's interest in it. Within a week Miller had "released" guitarist Andy Lefton and drummer Michel Langevin and made an ambivalent public statement about the status of the remaining members, expressing his resolve to continue the band alone if necessary. Miller eventually self-released the album in December 2020, after resurfacing with a new lineup for the band.

Musical style
Tau Cross' musical style is primarily described as crust punk, punk rock and heavy metal, with many critics referring to it as a continuation of the style of Miller's previous band Amebix The band have also been described as alternative rock, gothic rock, traditional doom metal, post-punk, progressive rock and thrash metal and industrial. Citing influences such as Killing Joke, Black Sabbath, Pink Floyd, Joy Division and 16th century English mysticism, their music has also been compared to the work of Motörhead, Prong and New Model Army.

Members
Current
Rob "The Baron" Miller - bass, vocals
The Kurgan - guitars
Talamh - drums

Former
Andy Lefton - guitar
Jon Misery - guitar
Tom Radio - bass
James Adams - keyboards
Michel "Away" Langevin - drums

Discography
Tau Cross (2015)
Pillar of Fire (2017)
Messengers of Deception (2020)

References

British crust and d-beat groups
Rock music supergroups
Musical groups established in 2013
Heavy metal supergroups
Music controversies
Relapse Records artists
2013 establishments in the United Kingdom